Infant crying is the crying of infants as a response to an internal or external stimulus. Infants cry as a form of basic instinctive communication. Essentially, newborns are transitioning from life in the womb to the external environment. Up to 27% of parents describe problems with infant crying in the first four months. Up to 38% identify a problem with their infant crying within the first year.  Parents can be concerned about the amount of time that their infant cries, how the infant can be consoled, and disrupted sleeping patterns. Colic is used as a synonym for excessive crying of infants, even though colic may not be the cause of excessive crying.

Physiology
Crying may elicit the Valsalva reflex. This reflex negatively impacts sucking pressures and results in poor feeding. The cortisol levels will rise along with blood pressure. Increased blood pressure will have an effect on cerebral blood flow, cerebral blood flow velocity and intracranial pressure. Increased pressures and velocity can lead to intracranial hemorrhage. Prolonged exhalation may also cause some adverse effects. Obstructed venous return and quick inspiratory gasp can occur. Foramen ovale shunting can occur. Adults can often determine whether an infant's cries signify anger or pain. Most parents also have a better ability to distinguish their own infant's cries than those of a different child. Babies mimic their parents' pitch contour. French infants wail on a rising note while German infants favor a falling melody. Overstimulation may be a contributing factor to infant crying and that periods of active crying might serve the purpose of discharging overstimulation and helping the baby’s nervous system regain homeostasis.

Misconceptions
Misconceptions regarding the purpose of crying in the infant are common among caregivers and medical personnel. These are usually determined by cultural mores and not by evidence-based explanations. The crying of an infant is regarded by some to be normal and good. The belief that infants have a need to cry to expand or exercise their lungs is not supported by research. This is because a healthy newborn infant lung's are able to contain a sufficient amount of air plus a reserve. Birth trauma is related to the amount of crying. Mothers who had experienced obstetrical interventions or who were made to feel powerless during birth had babies who cried more than other babies. Babies who had experienced birth complications had longer crying spells at three months of age and awakened more frequently at night crying. When infants cry for no obvious reason after all other causes (such as hunger or pain) are ruled out, the crying may signify a beneficial stress-release mechanism, although not all sources agree with this. The "crying-in-arms" approach is a way to comfort these infants. Another way of comforting and calming the baby is to mimic the familiarity of the mother’s womb. Consistency and promptness of maternal response is associated with a decline in frequency and duration of crying by the end of the first year, and individual differences in crying reflect the history of maternal responsiveness rather than constitutional differences in infant irritability. There is online training to address the educational needs of the parents of the infant and caregivers in the understanding and handling of infant crying.

Causes
Most infants cry in response to something, although it may be difficult to identify the cause. Sometimes there may be no apparent reason. 

Some possible reasons include:
 Hunger
 Sleepiness (Normally just yawns or rubs eyes)
 Gas pain (for example, if the baby has not burped)
 Discomfort (for example, a wet diaper)
 Temperature (for example, feeling too hot or too cold)
 External stimulus (for example, too much noise or light)
 Boredom or loneliness
 Pain (for example, teething)

Excessive crying in infants may indicate colic or another health problem. Some health problems are listed below:

 Trauma
 Abuse
 Corneal abrasions
 Foreign body in the eye
 Fractured bone
 Central nervous system abnormality
 Chiari type I malformation
 Infantile migraine
 Subdural hematoma
 Constipation
 Cow’s milk protein intolerance
 Gastroesophageal reflux
 Lactose intolerance
 Rectal fissure
 Infection
 Meningitis
 Otitis media
 Urinary tract infection
 Viral illness
 Hair tourniquet syndrome

Colic

The term 'colic' was defined in 1954 as: "crying for more than three hours per day, for more than three days per week, and for more than three weeks in an infant that is well-fed and otherwise healthy." Colic and excessive crying by infants is synonymous to some clinicians. Colic is attributed to gastrointestinal discomfort like intestinal cramping. Clinicians often admit that colic can't be treated or that alternative treatments are ineffective. The protocol followed by clinicians to treat colic is described as "treating the parents" with reassurance.

Maternal responses
Crying in infants is associated with high stress levels and depression in mothers. Excessive crying has also been linked to maternal "physical aggression" and "angry speaking". The burden of care of the mother, that is, mothers without assistance in caring for the infant, are more prone to physical aggression and angry speaking. During evaluations of maternal depression responses to infant crying, sleeping problems are closely associated with excessive crying and may confound the conclusions of such research. Also, it is not always clear that when sleeping problems are associated with infant crying, whether the sleeping problems are descriptive of the mother or the infant or both. Maternal stress is associated with excessive crying.

Effects on young children
One definition used to study excessive crying in infants (colic) is crying for three or more hours per 24 hours. Excessive infant crying has been associated with a twofold increased risk of the overall problem behavior, conduct problems, hyperactivity, and mood problems at the age of 5–6. Excessive infant crying doubles the risk of behavioral, hyperactivity, and mood problems at the age of 5–6, as reported by their mother. Excessive crying is not the only factor in later childhood difficulties. Behavioral problems in childhood include the so-called regulatory problems, such as excessive crying, sleeping, and feeding problems, which occur in 20% of infants in multiproblem families. Excessive crying, whining and sleeping problems at 4–6 months are associated with decreased social development at 12 months.

Several factors may contribute to, and partly explain, an association between excessive infant crying and later behavioral and emotional problems. During early infancy, the quality of the mother–child dyad can be considered to be a crucial vehicle for child’s healthy mental development. Both early maternal and early paternal reciprocity in infancy are predictive of social competence and lower aggression in preschoolers.

Compared to other infants, excessive crying infants had a slightly lower birth weight and a slightly younger gestational age. Excessive crying infants more often had a single, lower educated mother, originating from a non-industrialized country, who reported more depression, a higher burden of infant care, and more aggressive behavior and had an authoritarian parenting style. Excessive crying was associated with a higher risk for hyperactivity/inattention problems, emotional symptoms, conduct problems, peer relationship problems, and overall problem behavior at the age of 5–6, as well as a higher risk for decreased pro-social behavior as reported by the mother. Excessive crying was also associated with mood problems as well as generalized anxiety problems at the age of 5–6.

Abuse

Normal crying
The physical abuse of infants is related to crying. Crying may be related to the abusive head trauma in infants. This is the most common cause of child abuse death. Fathers are often the ones who shake the infant. Shaking may occur many times. This shaking can cause serious injuries almost 50% of the time. Some caregivers are unaware that shaking the baby can seriously harm or kill the infant. This type of abuse is being addressed by efforts to educate parents and caregivers with educational flyers and videos.

Prevention and treatment
Infant crying is most excessive in the first several months of life, but lessens as the infant develops. A baby can sometimes be calmed by rocking gently, offering a pacifier, singing or talking softly, taking a walk with a stroller, or going for a drive in the car. If a baby won’t stop crying, it can be sick and seen by a doctor. Frustration and stress can be overwhelming for those with an infant that cries for hours on end. If caregivers feel as if they may lose control there are preventative measures that can be taken. The caregiver may benefit by calling a friend, relative, neighbor, or parent helpline for support. Another suggestion is to  put the baby in a safe place and walk away. The baby can be checked  every 5 to 10 minutes.
Babies may be in danger if a person who is easily irritated, has a temper or a history of violence cares for or watches the baby.

When "normal" causes of excessive crying are ruled out, some caregivers adopt alternative and complementary treatments for excessive crying. Those practices include:
 Eliminating milk products, eggs, wheat, and nuts from the diet of breastfeeding mothers
 Feeding infants fiber-enriched formula; not proven to be of benefit for most infants
 Counseling parents about specific colic-management techniques; not proven to be effective for most infants
 Infant massage; not proven to be effective or recommended

Those who realize that an infant can be in a situation where abuse is a possibility, support can be offered to give a parent or caregiver a break when needed. Education and understanding can let the parent know that dealing with a baby that is crying excessively can be very frustrating—especially when they are tired or stressed, however crying is a normal behavior in infants and will subside at some point. Parents can be encouraged to take a calming break if needed while the baby is safe in the crib. Others can be sensitive and supportive in situations when parents are trying to calm a baby that is crying continuously.

References

External links
 Crying it out

Bibliography
 

Pain scales
Pain
Pediatrics
Palliative care
Crying
Infancy
Parenting
Human development
Developmental psychology
Sleep
Wikipedia articles incorporating text from the Centers for Disease Control and Prevention
Child abuse